Ahmad Drushane Brooks (born March 13, 1980) is a retired National Football League player and sports broadcaster for ESPNU, the Longhorn Network and KTXX-FM. He is also co-founder and president of Helping Adolescents/Athletes Lead Others (HALO). Brooks is a graduate of the University of Texas, where he served as captain of the football team in 2001. He played in the NFL for three years before retiring in 2005.

Early life
Ahmad excelled in both the classroom and on the field at an early age. By the age of five, he became a Grand Champion in karate where he was given the nickname "Tank" for his exceptional karate skills and abilities. Not only was Ahmad an upcoming karate champion, but he also was a standout in soccer, baseball, and football.

Prior to graduating from Abilene High School, he was a member of the U-16 US National Soccer Pool and led the Abilene Eagles football squad to their best record in decades. In addition, Ahmad became Abilene High’s first Division I football signee in 11 years and the school’s first player to earn a spot in the Texas HS Coaches Association All-Star Game since 1964.

He was voted class president of his high school all four years, while also serving as a four-year student council representative, a member of Youth City Council and a prep scholar and mentor.

Career

College
In 1998, Ahmad signed and became a valuable member of the University of Texas football team for Coach Mack Brown’s inaugural recruiting class at UT. By the conclusion of his senior year, he and his teammates were deemed as the winningest class in UT history.

Brooks' personal accomplishments include receiving action in 51 games and starting 27 contests while recording 182 tackles, four sacks, four interceptions, 27 pass breakups, seven forced fumbles and three fumble recoveries in four years at UT. In addition, he secured a team-high 88 tackles for the #1 ranked defense in the country during 2001 season, including a career-high 22 stops in the Big 12 Championship Game against Colorado. Brooks led the Longhorns with 16 pass breakups and two interceptions in 1999.

Brooks served as Team Captain in 2001 to his teammates and school along with Major Applewhite and Deandre Lewis. The honors he received included an All-Big 12 mention as well as receiving the University of Texas Outstanding Senior Award for accomplishments on and off the football field.  He was a member of the Athletics Dean’s Honor Roll while also serving on the Student-Athlete Advisory Council as the Longhorn football team representative.

NFL
Following his tenure at Texas, Brooks entered the National Football League as an undrafted free agent. He was signed to the Buffalo Bills off the practice squad October 20, 2002. He played for the Bills for one season, recording 11 tackles and no sacks. Brooks retired from the NFL in 2005.

After football

Brooks received a Bachelor of Science degree in Communication Studies from UT in the fall of 2005.

Brooks calls football games for ESPNU and appears on ESPN’s Longhorn Network covering Texas football practice, breaking down the Horns in studio and as a football analyst, alongside Ricky Williams and Lowell Galindo.

From 2006 to 2010, Brooks was the television host for Longhorn Sports Center with Mack Brown and radio host of Wake Up Call with Jon Madani from 2008 to 2011 on AM 1300 The Zone.

Brooks is also a college football analyst for the university flagship radio station, 104.9 The Horn.

From 2006 to 2013, Brooks worked for Fox Sports Southwest as color commentator and sideline reporter.

In 2012, Brooks co-hosted "Man 2 Man Coverage" on Sundays from 11 a.m. to 12 noon (CST) on the New Talk Radio 96.3 and 1370 with three-time Super Bowl champion Robert Jones.

Brooks' philanthropic efforts include founding HALO and assisting numerous non-profits in raising millions of dollars throughout the years as an emcee and mentoring young people all over the country.

References

External links
Sports Radio Article
Texas Sports website
Texas Sports Article

1980 births
Living people
American football cornerbacks
Buffalo Bills players
College football announcers
New Orleans Saints players
Players of American football from Texas
Sportspeople from Abilene, Texas
Texas Longhorns football players